Lucas de Franchis (1575 – 1615) was a Roman Catholic prelate who served as Bishop of Ugento (1614–1615).

Biography
Lucas de Franchis was born in Naples, Italy.
On 27 January 1614, he was appointed by Pope Paul V as Bishop of Ugento. He served as Bishop of Ugento until his death in 1615.

References

External links and additional sources
 (for Chronology of Bishops) 
 (for Chronology of Bishops) 

1575 births
1615 deaths
17th-century Italian Roman Catholic bishops
Bishops appointed by Pope Paul V